Jeremy Shamos (born February 22, 1970) is an American actor.

Early life
Shamos was born in New York City but raised in Denver, Colorado. He has a M.F.A. from New York University.

Career
Shamos is a character actor, his most notable roles are Craig Kettleman on Better Call Saul, Johanes Karlsen in Nurse Jackie and Ralph in the film Birdman or (The Unexpected Virtue of Ignorance).

Shamos is also a stage actor, starring in productions including Steve Martin's Meteor Shower, Clybourne Park for which Shamos was nominated for a Tony Award, The Qualms, The Assembled Parties, Dinner with Friends, 100 Saints You Should Know, and Elling.

Personal life
Shamos is married to actress Nina Hellman. They have two children, a daughter and a son.

Filmography

Films

Television

Awards and nominations

References

External links

1970 births
Living people
American male film actors
American male television actors
American male stage actors
21st-century American male actors
Male actors from Denver
Male actors from New York City
American people of Greek descent